"The Lambda Factor" is the nineteenth episode of the second series of Space: 1999 (and the forty-third episode overall of the programme).  The screenplay was written by Terrance Dicks; the director was Charles Crichton.  The final shooting script is dated 6 August 1976, with amendments dated 2 September, 15 September, 27 September, 28 September, 29 September and 5 October 1976.  Live action filming took place Wednesday 29 September 1976 through Friday 15 October 1976.

Story
It is 2308 days after leaving Earth orbit, and the Moon is drifting through an empty region of space the Alphans have dubbed the 'Peace Zone'.  Contrary to expectations, the past several days have not been uneventful; the community is plagued by sporadic disturbances and petty irritations.  Doctor Helena Russell is currently dealing with a matter of discipline.  Medical technician Sally Martin has repeatedly failed to complete an inventory of the medical stores; as a result, she has been ordered to finish it during her off-duty time.  Devastated after a broken engagement, the girl sulkily carries out the assignment.

Alone in the storeroom, Sally is the focus of a series of disturbing events.  A heavy jar slides off a high shelf, narrowly missing her.  A cabinet door spontaneously slides shut, almost catching her fingers.  Finally, the lights die and a sourceless wind invades the room, sending loose objects flying at her from the shelves.  After the exit hatch closes and locks on its own, a panicked Sally takes refuge in an adjoining compartment.  While she cowers in a corner, the hatch is torn in two by an unseen force.  As the wind surges in, a tremendous pressure crushes the life out of her.

During this tragedy, John Koenig is sleeping fitfully.  In his dreams, he is tormented by the ghostly image of a woman—who accuses him of having killed her.  An urgent call from Helena awakens the Commander.  Arriving as the stretcher team collects Sally's body, Koenig joins the doctor and Tony Verdeschi in Medical Stores to survey the chaotic scene.  Haggard and ill-tempered, he snaps at Helena to conduct an immediate autopsy.  In the event something hostile has broken in, Koenig orders the whole of Moonbase Alpha searched.  Not dismissing the possibility of foul play, he also asks for a dossier on the dead girl.

As the Moon approaches a gaseous formation filled with electrically-charged particles, the Command Centre staff frets over a number of minor equipment malfunctions.  With the sensors among those instruments affected, Maya can only hypothesise the spiralling mass is the source of the interference.  Unusually irritable, Koenig is displeased over the lack of definitive information.  He is further frustrated by the results of the autopsy:  Sally's body is shattered internally, yet Helena can find no evidence of any blow or weapon being used.

Verdeschi's investigation into Sally's death is sidetracked by an altercation in the Recreation Centre.  Carl Renton, usually unlucky at games of chance, has won seventeen times in a row.  This unprecedented streak earns him an accusation of cheating from his volatile opponent, George Crato.  When Verdeschi happens upon Crato roughing-up the mild-mannered Renton, the security chief subdues the thug and ejects him from the lounge.  Getting back to the task at hand, he locates his two prime suspects:  Mark Sanders, Sally's ex-fiancé and Carolyn Powell, Sally's former roommate—and Sanders' current lover.  Interrupting a romantic interlude, Verdeschi informs them of Sally's death.

Koenig interviews the lovers separately.  It is revealed that Sally and Sanders' break-up was quite acrimonious—especially when he began seeing Carolyn immediately afterward.  Of course, each denies killing Sally.  Though both have alibis, Carolyn has piqued Verdeschi's suspicion—the woman is experimenting with a device that can project waves of intense pressure.  Later, the security chief visits Carolyn's laboratory; during a heated interrogation, he all but accuses her of murdering Sally.  Furious, the engineer smashes her invention—to prevent it and she from being blamed for any future murders.

Alan Carter is also conducting an investigation, as three-quarters of the Eagle fleet is currently non-operational.  Records show that every affected ship was worked on by Chief Engineer Pete Garforth.  Garforth has only recently returned to duty after recuperating from injuries obtained in a bad crash; the frustrated engineer  is unable to offer any explanation for the string of malfunctions.  After Garforth is called away, Carter lingers in the workshop for a moment.  When trying to leave, he finds the hatch unresponsive to his commlock.  Without reason, a large atomic booster motor starts of its own accord.

Carter finds he can neither shut it off nor disconnect the power.  With the engine building to an overload, he begins to panic when discovering all communications to and from the room are jammed.  Fortunately, Verdeschi and Maya are passing through the Technical Section.  The pair is attracted to the workshop by the motor's deafening whine, and Carter shouts a warning through the door.  Maya transforms into a mountain gorilla and forces the hatch open.  She jerks the motor's power cable right out of the wall, narrowly averting a nuclear explosion.

As the Moon moves closer to the space phenomenon, the instruments begin detecting electrical activity resembling the lambda waves produced in the human brain.  Helena recognises it to be the lambda variant, a rare wave-pattern discovered during research into ESP and human parapsychology.  Koenig authorises experiments to determine if the lambda variant could be investing the Alphans with paranormal powers.  After the first round of tests, Helena presents her findings to Koenig.  The lambda variant has created above-average psi powers in over ninety percent of the Alpha population.  Three subjects have demonstrated extraordinary paranormal abilities:  Carl Renton, Pete Garforth and Carolyn Powell.

Throughout the briefing, Koenig struggles with exhaustion.  He rejects Helena's offer of a sedative, revealing the insomnia is intentional—he is afraid to sleep.  During astronaut training, Koenig accompanied a mission to the Venus space station.  On arrival, the crew found the station's personnel had contracted a deadly, possibly extraterrestrial, disease.  These men were abandoned, lest Earth be exposed to a lethal pandemic.  Two of their own crew had already boarded the station—Koenig's best friend, Sam, and Sam's fiancée, Tessa.  They, too, were left to perish.  Now, their ghosts invade his dreams, blaming him for their deaths.  He cites the irony that whether he decides to sleep or not, the consequences of either choice will drive him mad.

Sanders has been avoiding Carolyn for days.  When they meet, he states his feeling for her have changed—then announces their relationship is over.  After he leaves, a seething Carolyn vows she will never let him go.  Later, Sanders walks the corridors—failing at first to notice the lights fading in his wake.  Suddenly hit by a blast of wind, he is forced into a cul-de-sac.  While a smirking Carolyn watches from the shadows, Sanders' body is pulped by the unseen force.  Not long after, the senior executives inspect the scene.  Though an energy surge was detected within the phenomenon at the time of Sanders' death, Verdeschi is convinced the killer is Carolyn.

Helena insists any of the three 'sensitives' could be responsible; one final test should pinpoint the culprit.  Maya has improvised a force-field to block the lambda variant; anyone shielded within who still demonstrates paranormal abilities has the power to have caused the deaths.  Garforth and Renton are tested and the results are negative.  Carolyn is the last to enter the shielded booth.  Corrupted by her new powers and hating the world, she toys with Helena.  Carolyn first pretends to have been rendered powerless by the force-field, then dramatically reveals her considerable abilities to a shocked audience.

As the guards close in, Carolyn unleashes her sinister force on the entire group.  They are saved by Maya who, as a tiger, distracts the other woman and chases her from the room.  While gathering her wits, Helena receives a call that a hysterical Koenig has fled Command Centre.  The disease-scarred 'ghosts' of Sam and Tessa are now appearing to Koenig while he is conscious, terrorising him at every turn.  The Commander is found in his quarters, catatonic and curled up in the foetal position.

As Koenig is conveyed to Medical, Verdeschi and Maya encounter the now-psychotic Carolyn in Command Centre—enthroned behind the command desk and holding court over the immobilised staff.  Unable to resist Carolyn's malevolent influence, they are humiliated for her amusement.  Verdeschi is made to grovel at her feet and call her 'Commander'.  After forcing her into a number of shape-changes, Carolyn contemplates crushing the caterpillar that is Maya under her boot.  Instead, she opts to let the metamorph suffocate inside an airtight container.

Helena uses narcosynthesis to treat Koenig, breaking through the protective barriers his tortured mind has erected.  Now conscious, he must confront the spectres of Sam and Tessa.  At first, Koenig's sense of guilt has him on the verge of surrendering himself to their judgment.  Supported by Helena's love and guidance, he musters the strength to face them.  After an exhausting catharsis, he admits there was no choice but to abandon the pair—and, as friends, they would have forgiven him.  As Koenig releases years of repressed guilt, the ghosts created by his own psi powers fade away.  He collapses in Helena's comforting arms.

Helena assesses the situation.  In the case of the 'sensitives', the lambda-wave emissions seem to have amplified hidden aspects of the psyche.  Always the loser, Renton is now able to psychically influence any game he plays.  With the crash evoking a subconscious fear of flying, Garforth's power sabotages the ships he works on—preventing the need for a post-repair test flight.  Carolyn's feelings of inadequacy can convert any negative feelings directed at her into a savage, killing force.  Being in rapport with the phenomenon, Carolyn is able to draw on its power at will.

Koenig is the only person on Alpha with paranormal abilities equal to Carolyn's.  Though mentally and physically spent, he must now confront her.  She maliciously strikes out with her mind—but he calmly resists her every attack.  A vortex of wind builds in Command Centre, the two combatants standing in the calm eye, locked in a mental battle of wills.  Denied the negative emotions she requires, Carolyn weakens and is herself swept aside by the gale.  Overwhelmed by the struggle, the spinning mass in space vanishes.  As its influence ebbs, Carolyn's victims are released and Maya is rescued in the nick of time.

Later, Koenig and Helena mull over recent events.  The Alphans have all returned to normal—with the exception of Carolyn.  The experience has left her mind wiped clean; innocent as a newborn, she will have to grow up all over again.  While the doctor reflects on the untapped potential of the human mind, a weary Koenig drifts into a dreamless sleep.  Helena smiles at her sleeping lover, then gives him a tender kiss.

Cast

Starring
Martin Landau — Commander John Koenig
Barbara Bain — Doctor Helena Russell

Also Starring
Catherine Schell — Maya

Featuring
Tony Anholt — Tony Verdeschi
Nick Tate — Captain Alan Carter
Zienia Merton — Sandra Benes

Guest Stars
 Deborah Fallender — Carolyn Powell
 Jess Conrad — Mark Sanders

Also Featuring
 Antony Stamboulieh — George Crato
 Michael Walker — Carl Renton
 Gregory de Polnay — Chief Engineer Pete Garforth
 Lydia Lisle — Sally Martin
 Lucinda Curtis — Tessa
 Dallas Adams — Sam

Uncredited Artists
 Nicholas Young — Peter
 Vic Armstrong — Recreation Centre Security Guard
 Quentin Pierre — Corridor Security Guard
 Jenny Cresswell — Command Centre Operative

Music
The score was re-edited from previous Space: 1999 incidental music tracks composed for the second series by Derek Wadsworth and draws primarily from the scores of "One Moment of Humanity" and "Space Warp".

Production Notes
 Prolific writer Terrance Dicks is best known for his long-term association with Doctor Who.  In 1968, he joined the BBC programme as an assistant script editor during a period of transition; in 1970 he became script editor, holding this position for the entire five-year Jon Pertwee era.  Through the 70s and 80s, he would still write for the series and pen a number of Doctor Who novels for Target Books.  Dicks recalled being persuaded into meeting producer Fred Freiberger by his agent.  This meeting was peculiar as Dicks had no knowledge of the programme and Freiberger initially mistook Dicks for another writer.  After conceiving this supernatural science-fiction tale, Dicks telephoned Freiberger, who approved the idea on the spot.  Dicks duly submitted his script and received a cheque—but not one word of feedback or an invitation to the shoot.  It was not until years later that he discovered it had been produced.
 Minor changes were made during the amendments: (1) Initially described as a yellow cloud, the revisions transformed the space phenomenon into a stylised whirling mass; (2) Sally was described as blonde and beautiful, where Carolyn was dark and unconventional, possessing a 'smouldering sensuality'; (3) Bully George Crato was originally named 'Harry Garth'.  The gambling game was described as space-age craps, with an automated dice-shaker; (4) Several stage directions indicated Carolyn initially felt remorse and guilt for her actions.  One scene cut from the final print would have seen her at a mirror, pleading with her reflection for help.
 After working with lions, panthers and falcons, the crew undeniably asserted the most troublesome animal performer was the chimpanzee featured in this instalment.  Zienia Merton recalled how the animal refused to take direction, first fascinated by the actors standing motionless, then distracted by the TV monitor and flashing lights on her desk.  When dropping to the floor, it latched onto her leg in an inappropriately affectionate manner.  Crossing to Tony Anholt (who was lying on the floor), it proceeded to slobber on his face
 The large Recreation Centre set assembled for this episode would also appear in the following installment, "The Seance Spectre"; it was one of the few Alpha interiors to show exterior windows during the second series.  The Venus station incident was mentioned by Koenig in "The Exiles"; Sam and Tessa's role was revealed in this episode.

Novelisation
The episode was adapted in the fourth Year Two Space: 1999 novel The Psychomorph by Michael Butterworth published in 1977.  The author would give the story a new antagonist:  a massive non-corporeal space amoeba.  The sentient amoeba required a massive influx of radiation in order to survive.  It would manipulate the Alphans with the lambda-wave effect to provide the explosion that would be its salvation.  Butterworth added a line where Koenig's return to Command Centre interrupts Carolyn Powell from ordering the meltdown of the Moonbase nuclear reactors.

References

External links
Space: 1999 - "The Lambda Factor" - The Catacombs episode guide
Space: 1999 - "The Lambda Factor" - Moonbase Alpha's Space: 1999 Page

1976 British television episodes
Space: 1999 episodes